Virtus (minor planet designation: 494 Virtus) is an 86 km minor planet orbiting the Sun. It was discovered by Max Wolf on October 7, 1902. Its provisional name was 1902 JV.

References

External links 
 Lightcurve plot of 494 Virtus, Palmer Divide Observatory, B. D. Warner (2005)
 Asteroid Lightcurve Database (LCDB), query form (info )
 Dictionary of Minor Planet Names, Google books
 Asteroids and comets rotation curves, CdR – Observatoire de Genève, Raoul Behrend
 Discovery Circumstances: Numbered Minor Planets (1)-(5000) – Minor Planet Center
 
 

Background asteroids
Virtus
Virtus
C-type asteroids (Tholen)
Ch-type asteroids (SMASS)
19021007